Belize competed at the 2017 World Championships in Athletics in London, United Kingdom, 4–13 August 2017.

Results

Women
Track and road events

Nations at the 2017 World Championships in Athletics
World Championships in Athletics
Belize at the World Championships in Athletics